Turkmen grammar is the grammar of the Turkmen language, whose dialectal variants are spoken in Turkmenistan, Iran, Afghanistan, Russia (in Stavropol krai), China (Salar Turkmens), Uzbekistan, Tajikistan and others. Turkmen grammar, as described in this article, is the grammar of standard Turkmen as spoken and written by Turkmen people in Turkmenistan.

Turkmen is a highly agglutinative language; that is, much of the grammar is expressed by means of suffixes added to nouns and verbs. It is very regular compared with many other languages of non-Turkic group.

Another characteristic of Turkmen is vowel harmony. Most suffixes have two or four different forms, the choice between which depends on the vowel of the word's root or the preceding suffix.

Verbs have six grammatical persons (three singular and three plural), various voices (active, passive, reflexive, reciprocal and causative), and a large number of grammatical tenses. Meanings such as "not", "be able", "must" and "if", which are expressed as separate words in most other languages, are usually expressed with verbal suffixes in Turkmen. A characteristic of Turkmen which is shared by neighbouring languages such as Persian is that the perfect tense suffix (in Turkmen -miş, -myş) often has an inferential meaning, e.g. gelýärmiş "it would seem (they say) that he/she is coming".

Verbs also have a number of participial forms, which Turkmen makes plentiful use of. Clauses which begin with "who" or "because" in English are generally expressed by means of participial phrases in Turkmen. Meanings such as "behind", "for", "like/similar to" etc. are expressed as postpositions following the noun rather than prepositions before it.

Phonology 
The following phonemes are present in the Turkmen language:

Vowels 
Turkmen contains phonemic short and long vowels, although the vowel length other than phonemes of üý and ä is not reflected in the orthography. Turkmen also employs vowel harmony, a process that is common in fellow Turkic languages. Vowels and their sounds are as follows:

Some optionally mark vowel length by macrons, as in daş¹ "far", daş² "outside", and dāş "stone"; or by a colon, as in da:ş. Despite the fact that ⟨ä⟩ is always long, it is optionally marked with one of these diacritics above, so the letter ⟨ä⟩ in some loanwords like şäher and ähli is pronounced short. Technically, all vowels have long and short variants (if including ē and short ä), but the existence of the previously-mentioned phonemes are fairly rare. The long ē only exists in the indefinite future suffix -ēr (the front variant never appears as **-är) and its compensatory lengthening unreflected in orthography (see § Phonological processes), while the short ä only exists in Persian loans and historical fusions (alyp gitmek → äkitmek).

Long vowels cause the final voiceless consonant to be voiced; compare ōt /oːd/ with dialectal Turkish od (both mean "fire").

Examples of short and long pairs 
This article uses macrons for words containing long vowels.

Vowel harmony 
Like other Turkic languages, Turkmen is characterised by vowel harmony. In general, words of native origin consist either entirely of front vowels (inçe çekimli sesler) or entirely of back vowels (ýogyn çekimli sesler). Prefixes and suffixes reflect this harmony, taking different forms depending on the word to which they are attached.

The infinitive form of a verb determines whether it will follow a front vowel harmony or back vowel harmony. Words of foreign origin, mainly Russian, Persian or Arabic, do not follow vowel harmony.

In addition to this backness harmony, progressive rounding harmony is also found in Turkmen. There are few suffixes which exhibits written close vowel rounding harmony, like the genitive case ending (-iň/un/ün/yn), the (nominal) possessive suffixes, and past tense suffixes, but not with mid and open vowels, where it otherwise not reflected in the orthography.

Labial harmony in loanwords are inconsistent, and it is only works in loans that assimilated to the Turkmen phonology like Perso-Arabic loans.

Stress 
Turkmen stress usually falls in the last syllable, with a secondary stress in the first syllable of a word containing more than three syllables (abadan "prosperous" /ˌɑbɑˈdɑn/). The exceptions to this rule include some pre-accenting suffixes and particles (the stress moves to the previous syllable), and loanwords preserve its original stress.

Consonants 
Turkmen consonant phonemes (shown with the letters of the Turkmen alphabet used to represent them), not including allophones:

The value  and  only exist in loanwords. /s, z/ also occurs in Russian loanwords but its pronunciation may depend on the speaker's level of bilingualism with Russian.

Phonological processes 
These consonant combinations are pronounced differently and assimilated in spoken Turkmen:

Thus, geler (third-person singular indefinite future of gelmek "to go") is actually pronounced as gēr. The phoneme  spirantize to [] before and after obstruents, after taps, word-finally, and intervocalically regardless of the preceding and succeeding vowels; while before back vowels it becomes  instead. The phonemes  and  become  and  before back vowels.

Nominals

Nouns
Turkmen has six cases: nominative, (specifically definite) accusative, dative, genitive, instrumental/ablative and locative. Plurals are formed from -lar/ler, but it is not used when the quantity is explicit. Nouns can also take possessive suffixes, see also § Personal morphemes.

Suffixes

Nouns ending in -ç, -k, -p, -t are voiced to -j, -g, -b, and -d in accusative, genitive, and dative endings; however, it is somewhat inconsistent as the monosyllabic nouns does not follow rules, but another monosyllabic nouns containing a long vowel which not reflected on the Turkmen orthography, does. The Turkmen genitive exhibits written labial harmony, yielding to -iň, -yň, -uň, and -üň.

When the noun ends in -e, the accusative, genitive, and dative ending became -äni, -äniň, and -ä (these endings were pronounced with long ). Also notice that dative of vowel-ending nouns has its last letter can being removed and just simply -a or -ä. If the third-from-last vowel contain a rounded vowel, the vowels -i and -y are automatically changed to -ü and -u before locative and ablative cases (doly → doludan).

Dative, locative and ablative ending also has endings in -ne, -nde, and -nden, but it is only used when preceded by third-person singular possessive suffix (öýü, öýüni, öýünüň, öýüne, öýunde, öýunden). After the second-person singular possessive suffix, the genitive ending -iň simply deletes (*öýüňiň → öýüň).

Vowel deletion
As in table below, ogul becomes ogly in accusative case. This vowel deletion occurred mostly in disyllabic nouns, when the first syllable is a short open vowel (including mid vowels) and last syllable is closed, while nouns with more than two syllables only applied to nouns with -iş/-yş verbal noun suffix and compounds containing nouns which retains its vowel deletion rules. These rules only apply to singular accusative, genitive, and dative cases; also with all single singular person possessive forms.

Examples of declension
Vowel lengths are included.

Adjectives
Adjectives typically come before the noun. Unlike Romance languages, adjectives does not agree with number or case of the following noun. Comparatives are made by the suffix -rek (follows vowel harmony), and superlatives are made analytically by adding iň or has before the adjective.

Pronouns 
Personal pronouns are inflected for cases; but unlike nouns, pronouns are inflected irregularly. Colloquially, genitive forms of singular pronouns were further fused to meň, seň, and oň, respectively. The irregular forms are in bold.

In addition to pronouns above, genitive pronouns can also has absolute possessive suffix -ky/ki by adding after genitive forms, resulting on forms meniňki, biziňki, seniňki, siziňki, onuňky, and olaryňky. This suffix can be also added on nouns.

The demonstrative pronouns include proximal bu and şu; medial ol and şol, and distal include all of medial demonstratives with addition of hol (all distal demonstratives are pronounced long ōl, şōl, and hōl). There are further distinctions between the demonstratives, the proximal şu is used for immediate objects while bu is for other objects; the distal hol is used for more distant objects, with remaining forms has no semantic differences (ol, şol). These demonstratives is also irregularly inflected like personal pronouns, with the oblique forms of bu, şu, ol, şol, and hol are mun-, şun-, on-, şon-, hon-; respectively.

Main interrogative pronouns include:

Other interrogative pronouns include näçe "how many", näçinji "which (of an ordinal series)", nädejerede "to what amount", nädip "how (manner)", nähili, neneň, and natüýsli "what kind of". With the exceptions of haýsy, naçan, and nähili, all interrogative pronouns are declinable like nouns.

Personal morphemes 
Here is the personal suffixes:

The "possessive" endings are not a true possessive, but rather attached to past and conditional tenses. Indirective particle and modal suffixes are ultimately have same suffixes, and the last syllable (-emok) of  -ok suffixes lacks vowel harmony ( → ýazamyzok, but  → gelemizok).

Despite the fact that nominal possessive suffixes only distinguishes number in first and second persons, the suffix -lary/leri in the meaning of "their" also exists. The singular and plural of 3rd person plural possessives are the same. These suffixes except for third-person suffixes has a written rounding harmony (in -im/um/üm/ym), but plural possessives (other than -leri) has a close unrounded vowel next to rounded vowel (imiz/umyz/ümiz/ymyz).

Nouns ending in -ç, -k, -p, and -t is also voiced to -j, -g, -b, and -d before vowel-starting suffixes, similarly to grammatical cases.

Verbs
Verbs are conjugated for numbers (singular and plural), persons (first, second and third), tenses (present, past, and future), and moods (indicative, conditional, obligational, intentional, imperative). Infinitives are formed by the suffix -mek, according to the vowel harmony rules.

Tense suffixes

Finite tenses
Definite future, intentional, and obligational are does not inflect for person and have the same forms, thus an explicit subject pronoun is needed. Thus, these tenses always use däl for their negations (for compound tenses, the ending is placed after däl, i.e. geljekdim → geljek däldim).

Fusion occurs in spoken Turkmen, for example spoken -ýän for standard -ýärin.

Continuous present
"Relic" simple present suffix -Ir can only used in four verbs,  "to sit",  "to sleep",  "to stand", and  "to walk" in these corresponding forms:

These special verbs are used to indicate a continuous action of something (general continuous actions in some parts of Turkmenistan), it is used with verb stem plus the converb suffix -yp/-ip. These forms can also used alone, and past continuous can also formed with third-person singular of these verbs + past tense suffixes.

Similar present continuous construction also occurs in Kazakh.

Imperatives

In additional to main imperatives, these imperative forms are somewhat more complex:

1st plural imperative (two people): /
Informal polite: -sana/sene
Formal polite: 
Request:  + 
Command: -seňizläň
Encouraging command: -ber
Polite 1st singular imperative:

Non-finites

There is various ways to form gerund by using the suffix -(ý)iş/uş/üş/yş, -ma/me, the infinitive, or by infinitive + dative suffix -a/-e. There is also desiderative gerund formed by infinitive + nominal possessive suffix + accusative suffix (...), or by the suffix -as/äs. Note the negative of -er is -mez, same as future indefinite suffix.

Negation
There are multiple ways to negate Turkmen verbs. Negation of some verb tenses is with the particle däl, similar to English "not"; but also to negate nouns or adjectives.

The phonetically similar suffix -ok is another option: it attaches to the verb which it negates.  It comes after the stem and before the tense suffix. The suffix -ok does not modify its form due to vowel harmony. In addition to -ok there is another suffix -me which placed before the tense suffix.  It appears that -me is used when dealing with one event and -ok for more habitual or lasting states:

Men bilemok.  
"I don't know."
Men bilemokdym.  
"I didn't know (for a long time)."
Men bilmedim.  
"I didn't know (on one occasion)."

(These correspond to the positive forms Men bilyärin, Men bilyärdim and Men bildim. The suffix -ok is irregularly inflected, see § Personal morphemes. Instead of forming *-mer, the negative indefinite future suffix yields -mez and it is also irregularly inflected. The converb -ip also has irregular negative -män)

Speakers of Eastern dialects of Turkmen, influenced by Uzbek, are less likely to utilise the -ok suffix.

There is no an equivalent in Turkmen to the English prefix 'un-'.  That is, one can't simply attach an affix to a verb to indicate the opposite action, as in wrap the present → unwrap the present. It appears that different tenses use different forms of negation, as in the following sentences:

Men ylgamok.
I am not running. (present)

Men ylgamadym.
I did not run.  (past)

Men ylgajak däl.
I will not run.  (definite future)

Evidentiality
Turkmen verbs can also mark evidentiality. Evidentiality of a reported event is determined by four markers, suffixed to the finite verb, roughly (the last syllable of -dirminäm lacks vowel harmony):

 -di (direct evidence, the past tense)
  (hearsay)
  (indirect evidence)
 -miş (rumoured that)

Some independent particles may be said to convey evidentiality: one such word is the particle eken.

Compare 1 with 2.a and 2.b:

i. The speaker saw Ben eat the cookies (direct evidence).

ii. Ben told the speaker that he ate the cookies.

i. The speaker heard from someone else that Ben ate the cookies (hearsay).

ii. Generally, the speaker learned through means other than 4.i and 4.ii that Ben ate the cookies.

i. The speaker saw evidence of the action, i.e. crumbs, and "made the connection." (informant's account)

ii. The speaker "doesn't concretely know [Ben] ate them." (informant's account)

iii. In the words of the informant: "I am questioning myself. But it's not a question."

iv. In other words: a deduction from indirect evidence, a suspicion

i. The speaker questions whether or not s/he has performed an action.

ii. Evidence of the particular action may be direct, however the nature of its complement (i.e. an item of food) may be in doubt.

i. The action has been passed on via several speakers, or gossiped, similar to in the English gloss.

Note the postposed complement in 7. A tree of 7 would look something like {(Ben [{(the one who ate [ti])} must be]) [your cookies] i} using different brackets only in order to make the nesting more obvious.
In 6.a., the verb appears in the form . The final two syllables have been analyzed as one evidential particle, glossed as EV. This follows partly from the intuitions of the informant, and partly from the consistence: it always appears as -minäm. Nonetheless, it could also be glossed as ...eat-EV-COP-INT-what..., something like, literally, 'Did Ben eat your cookies, or what?'

Additional suffixes

Interrogatives
Interrogatives are formed by the suffix -mi/my, it is not used when with interrogative pronouns like näme and kim.

Temporal
Temporal are marked with the suffix -ka/kä, the "possessive" personal suffixes (see also § Personal morphemes) was added to this suffix.

Verbal extensions
The causative suffixes -dir and -ir; and the passive,  reflexive, and reciprocal suffixes exhibits written labial harmony. Only the verb görmek "to see" which takes the causative suffix -kez. Note that these suffixes were derivational.
 Passive:  (after most letters except -l, where it same as reflexive)
 Reflexive: 
 Reciprocal: 
 Causative:  (after consonants); -t (after vowels); -ir; -üz; -er; -der

Others
-da/de preceded by a hyphen (-) is used to make meanings like "and", "also", and "even though" in conditional statements.

Syntax
The default word order in Turkmen is subject–object–verb (SOV). Verbs generally come at the end of the sentence or clause; and adjectives and possessive nouns come before the noun they describe. To mark absence of a noun or an adjective, is with the predicative adjective ýok.

Notes

References

External links
 Website about Turkmen grammars and orthography rules

Turkmen language
Turkic grammars